The Freiberger Mulde (also called the Östliche Mulde or Eastern Mulde) is the right-hand,  headstream of the river Mulde, whose catchment covers an area of  in the Czech Republic and Germany in central Saxony.

The source of the river is in the Ore Mountains, near Moldava, in the Czech Republic. It runs northwest, crossing the border with Germany after a few km, to Freiberg (hence the name), and further northwest through Nossen, Döbeln and Leisnig. A few km north of Colditz, the Freiberger Mulde is joined by the Zwickauer Mulde to form the Mulde. The Mulde is a tributary of the Elbe.

See also 
List of rivers of the Czech Republic
List of rivers of Saxony

References 

 
Rivers of Saxony
Rivers of the Ústí nad Labem Region
International rivers of Europe
Rivers of Germany